The Raft of the Dead is a 1921 German silent drama film directed by Carl Boese and starring Aud Egede-Nissen, Otto Gebühr, and Frida Richard. It premiered in Munich on 4 March 1921.

Cast

References

Bibliography

External links

With Das Floss der Toten the Dead Come Back to Town on Academia.edu

1921 films
Films of the Weimar Republic
German silent feature films
German drama films
Films directed by Carl Boese
1921 drama films
Films about amnesia
German black-and-white films
Silent drama films
1920s German films
1920s German-language films